William Holbech may refer to:

 William Holbech (bishop) (1850–1930), Bishop of St Helena, earlier Archdeacon of Kimberley and Dean of Bloemfontein
 William Holbech (cricketer) (1882–1914), English cricketer, killed in the First World War
 William Holbech (MP) (1748–1812), English member of parliament, for Banbury, Oxon.